The Lycée Edgar-Poe  is a private secondary school located in Paris, 2, rue du Faubourg Poissonnière, in the 10th arrondissement, very close to Le Grand Rex. It is named after the American writer Edgar Allan Poe (1809–1849). This school is far from the rue Edgar-Poe (19th arrondissement of Paris).

Its motto is « L’intérêt pour l’élève développe l’intérêt de l’élève » ('"The interest for the student develops the student's interest"). Its director is Mrs Evelyne Clinet. In 2011, it is the first secondary school of Paris and of the Île-de-France region considering the results at the Baccalauréat.

It is close to the Bonne Nouvelle Paris Métro station.

History 

The Lycée Edgar-Poe has been created in 1965 under the name Cours Edgar-Poe and has been recognized by the French State the 26 February 1980.

Results

Famous alumni
 Olivier Caudron (born in 1955), singer.
 François Ravard (born in 1957), French record and film producer.

See also

 Secondary education in France
 Education in France

References

External links
  Official

Education in Paris
1965 establishments in France
Edgar-Poe
Buildings and structures in the 10th arrondissement of Paris